Mirabilis alipes is a species of flowering plant in the four o'clock family known by the common name winged four o'clock. It is native to the southwestern United States from eastern California to western Colorado, where it grows in brush, woodland, and dry mountain slope habitat. The leaves are oppositely arranged on the spreading stem branches. The flowers occur in leaf axils on the upper branches. Five to nine flowers bloom from a cup-shaped involucre of several partly fused bracts.

External links
Jepson Manual Treatment
Photo gallery

Night-blooming plants
alipes
Flora of California
Flora of Colorado
Flora without expected TNC conservation status